The South African Navy (SA Navy) is the naval warfare branch of the South African National Defence Force.

The Navy is primarily engaged in maintaining a conventional military deterrent, participating in counter-piracy operations, fishery protection, search and rescue, and upholding maritime law enforcement for the benefit of South Africa and its international partners.

Today the South African Navy is one of the most capable naval forces in the African region, operating a mixed force of sophisticated warships, submarines, patrol craft, and auxiliary vessels, with over 7,000 personnel; including a marine force.

With formerly deep historical and political connections to the United Kingdom, the first emergence of a naval organisation was the creation of the South African Division of the British Royal Naval Volunteer Reserve in 1913, before becoming an nominally independent naval service for the Union of South Africa in 1922.

In its history, South African naval vessels and personnel have participated in the First and Second World Wars, as well as the South African Border War. In the apartheid post-war era, the South African Navy was extensively aligned with NATO and other Western nations against the Soviet Bloc.

History

Beginnings 
Officially, the South African Navy can trace its origins back to the creation of the South African Naval Service on 1 April 1922. Unofficially, however, the Navy has an unbroken association with the Natal Naval Volunteers, formed in Durban on 30 April 1885, and the Cape Naval Volunteers, formed in Cape Town in 1905. Loosely, and indirectly however, the earliest naval establishment was the Port Elizabeth Naval Volunteer Brigade, founded in 1861. On 1 July 1913, following the creation of the Union of South Africa in 1910, the South African Division of the Royal Navy Volunteer Reserve (RNVR[SA]) was established, although with complete organisational and operational control being directed by the Royal Navy.

First World War 
As part of the British Empire, South Africa went to war against the Central Powers on 4 August 1914, despite significant Afrikaner opposition. A total of 412 South Africans served in the RNVR[SA] during the war, with 164 members volunteering for the Royal Navy directly. One officer and eight ratings died during the course of the war.  South Africans would see service on warships in European waters and the Mediterranean, as well as participate in the land campaigns in German South West Africa and German East Africa. Under Royal Navy jurisdiction, the RNVR (SA) patrolled South African waters in converted fishing vessels, helping in mine clearance in response to the operations of the German raider Wolf in 1917, as well as protecting the strategically important Royal Navy naval base at Simon’s Town.

Interwar 
On 1 April 1922, the South African Naval Service (SANS) was formed and, alongside the RNVR (SA), tasked with the protection of territorial waters, minesweeping and hydrography. In the same year, the SANS commissioned the small hydrographic survey ship HMSAS (His/Her Majesty’s South African Ship) Protea, two minesweeping converted trawlers HMSAS Immortelle and HMSAS Sonneblom, and the Training Ship General Botha - all formerly in Royal Navy service. As a result of the Great Depression in 1929, coupled with lack of government investment, the SANS by 1939 had been forced to return all vessels to the Royal Navy. At the outbreak of the Second World War, the service had only three officers and three ratings in its ranks.

Second World War 
The British declaration of war against Germany on 3 September 1939 threw South Africa into a constitutional dilemma due to her status as an autonomous Dominion within the Commonwealth. Prime Minister J.B.M. Hertzog and other anti-British factions of the coalition United Party called for strict neutrality, whilst the more anglophile Deputy Prime Minister Jan Smuts advocated that South Africa was constitutionality, and morally, obliged to support Britain and fight fascism. Two days later, after a close parliamentary vote of 80 to 67 in favour of Smuts, South Africa followed Britain and declared war on Germany.

During October 1939, Rear-Admiral Guy Halifax, a retired Royal Navy officer living in South Africa, was appointed Director of the South African Naval Service, later renamed Seaward Defence Force (SDF) in January 1940. Overseeing a large industrial program of converting civilian whalers and fishing trawlers into military vessels, despite being highly primitive, over 80 such craft would go on to be the backbone of the South African naval forces.

In South African waters, the SDF, in partnership with the Royal Navy, ensured maritime control around the strategic Cape Sea route and was primarily involved in coastal patrol, mine clearance, and significant anti-submarine operations between 1942 and 1945 due to a sustained U-Boat offensive, with over 100 merchant ships being sunk off the South African coast.South African naval vessels similarly contributed to the Mediterranean theatre, and later the Far East. From 1941, South Africa assisted in escorting convoys along the North African coast, including the resupply and eventual evacuation of Tobruk, embarked on mine clearance operations, successfully engaged enemy submarines and undertook harbour salvage tasks. In 1942, a unified national naval service emerged following the successful amalgamation of the SDF and RNVR(SA), creating the South African Naval Forces (SANF). As the war came to its end, South Africa received its first purpose-built warships, three Loch-class frigates from the Royal Navy. Deployed to the Far East under British command, South Africa later contributed to operations to liberate Japanese held territory.

In total, over 10,000 service personnel volunteered for service in the SANF, and its predecessors, with 324 losing their lives and 26 battle honours gained.

Post war 

A year after the end of hostilities, on 1 May 1946 South African Naval Forces were reconstituted as part of the Union Defence Force before undertaking its final name change in July 1951, when the SANF officially became known as the South African Navy. The year 1948 was a turning point, not only for South Africa as a country following the National Party's electoral victory, but also the direction of the Navy. British influence became increasingly diminished and curtailed across the service. In 1952, the previously used ship prefix of HMSAS (His/Her Majesty's South African Ship) changed to just SAS (South African Ship), in 1957, the Royal Navy transferred control of Simon's Town naval base to the SA Navy after 70 years of occupancy and later, in 1959, the St Edward's Crown, which had featured in the Navy cap badge and other insignia, was replaced by the Lion of Nassau from South Africa's coat of arms.

In the immediate post-war years the South African Navy underwent significant levels of qualitative, and quantitative, expansion as the Royal Navy disposed of its surplus war materiel. In 1950, South Africa further expanded her naval capability and purchased the first of two former British W-class destroyers, in 1952 , and later, the Type 15 anti-submarine frigate  (formerly HMS Wrangler).

By the early 1960s, the South African Navy was fast reaching its highpoint of international inclusion and is generally considered to be the golden age of a well balanced, modern, and effective service optimised for conventional naval engagement alongside friendly Western international partners.

From 1962 to 1964, the South African Navy received three Type 12 President-class frigates: ,  and  respectively. These were first rate, ocean going fast fleet anti-submarine escorts that propelled the South African Navy into the age of a modern warship operator on equal footing with the West. The order of three  from France in 1968—to operate submarines for the first time—again catapulted the service further.

The second half of the 1970s however saw South Africa facing severe amounts of international isolation and criticism. In 1973 the UN labelled the policy of apartheid a "Crime against Humanity", magnified further by the brutal state repression and subsequent mass incarcerations and deaths following the Soweto uprising in 1976 and the death of prominent anti-apartheid activist Steve Biko in 1977. The following year a UN arms embargo, loosely in place since 1962, became mandatory. The ensuing international economic disinvestment from South Africa was stepped up, placing huge strains on the economy. Coupled with these severe problems, the cornerstones of the country's regional foreign policy faced collapse and complete transformation with the end of Portuguese rule in Angola and Mozambique in 1975, and the negotiated settlement in Ian Smith's Rhodesia to the end of white minority rule in 1979. As South Africa became increasingly involved in the Border War in South West Africa (modern day Namibia) and Angola, the Navy began to readjust its previous international outlook and organisation. The then Minister of Defence, P. W. Botha successfully sought military connections with Israel and nine "Reshef"— in South African service—missile strike craft were ordered in 1974. Following the Soweto uprising and subsequent mandatory arms embargo, South Africa had been forced to accept the cancellation of another significant naval procurement of two new Type-69A light frigates and two s from France.

In 1987, South Africa commissioned the locally designed and built Fleet Replenishment ship . Constructed in Durban, it remains the largest and most sophisticated warship to ever have built in South Africa. Three years earlier, the Navy's other support ship, had undergone a refit that greatly increased her amphibious capabilities. A real boost for the Navy's influence, Tafelberg could deploy a company strength landing force, six landing craft, two medium helicopters and be equipped with a small hospital. Throughout the decade, the South African Navy continued to participate in the Border War and coastal protection. For 23 years (1976–1989) the South African Navy maintained determined sea control around Southern Africa and provided valuable support to land operations. By the end of the 1980s, as white minority rule was coming to a negotiated end, the Navy had lost all of its major surface warships, had a drastically reduced anti-submarine/anti-aircraft capability across the board, and almost complete international isolation. As South Africa disentangled itself from external and internal security operations, the South African Defence Force underwent severe budgetary cuts. The Navy endured a reduction of personnel by 23%, the disbandment of the Marines, the closure of two Naval Commands (Naval Command East and Naval Command West), two Naval Bases at Cape Town and Walvis Bay, and the termination of the relatively advanced program to domestically build replacement submarines. A positive for the Navy during this period however was the acquisition of the multipurpose sealift/replenishment ship , a former Soviet-built Arctic supply vessel, in September 1992 as a replacement for the 35 year old Tafelberg.

Despite the austere cutbacks, the Navy was leading the way for a South Africa that was slowly being welcomed back into the international community, even before the landmark elections of 1994. Other international visits in the following years included Zaire, Kenya, Bangladesh, Turkey, France, Portugal, and Uruguay. As the "Rainbow nation" was lauded following the ANC victory in the first free democratic elections in 1994, one of the starkest symbols of this new era was the explosion of foreign warships and dignitaries visiting South African ports, often from countries that did not have a previous connection, such as Russia, Poland and Japan. In 1994, 21 foreign vessels from eight countries called at South African ports, with 26 visits from 12 countries in 1995, and 27 from ten countries in 1996. In 1997 the navy celebrated 75 years, with 15 countries sending ships for the festivities.

The acute need to re-equip the navy, including the wider Armed Forces after the lifting of apartheid-era sanctions, was addressed by the Strategic Defence Package of 1999. Better known as the infamous "Arms Deal", the acquisitions in the package, and those persons involved, have been repeatedly subject to substantive allegations of corruption, fraud and bribery. A total of R30 billion (US$4.8 billion in 1999) was pledged to the purchase of modern military equipment. For the navy, its share led to a total transformation from a "brown-water" force of ageing missile patrol craft and short-range submarines, to a force with significant “green-water” combat capability once again. In 2001, with an initial request of five vessels, later reduced to four, the German Meko A200SAN general purpose corvette design was procured (designated frigates in South Africa), along with four British Super Lynx naval helicopters, and three German Type 209/1400 diesel-powered submarines. Also under construction from 1991 were three locally built T-Craft inshore patrol boats. As South Africa approached the millennium, and beyond, the ANC government gradually returned the Navy to a level of maritime power last seen in the 1960s and 1970s, and successfully reintegrated the service back into maritime operations with regional and international partners.

South African Navy

Surface fleet 
Constructed with principles of stealthy design, the class has a 50% smaller radar signature of similar vessel size, 75% less infrared emissions, 20% lower life-cycle cost, 25% lower displacement and 30% fewer crew members. Specifically designed to conduct sustained operations in the sea conditions found off the South African coast, the four frigates are able to undertake a range of tasks from maritime law enforcement, to civil support, and military operations such as area denial, gunfire support and intelligence collection. The embarked SuperLynx helicopters significantly improve and extend surveillance, as well as all-round operational capabilities. With a return to operating general-purpose, multi-mission warships, the Valour class have been hailed as modern, impressive and major regional anti-surface, anti-air, and anti-submarine platforms.

As of February 2023, only Makhanda remains in service. From June 2022, the Patrol Flotilla was strengthened by the commissioning SAS King Sekhukhune I, the first of three Multi-Mission Inshore Patrol Vessels (MMIPVs) being constructed by Damen Shipyards Cape Town.

Primarily, the Patrol Flotilla undertake the more traditional naval task of patrolling South Africa's exclusive economic zone and upholding maritime law enforcement. Ordinary tasks include anti-smuggling, monitoring against illegal immigration, search and rescue, fishery inspection, and routine border protection. With the ability to operate far out into the Cape and handle the often rough seas, the Flotilla is also expected to complement the navies combat ability, particularly when undertaking anti-piracy patrols in the Mozambique Channel.

Reflecting their new policing role, the Warriors' old Skerpioen missile launchers and the rear 76 mm gun was removed. In replacement, the craft have gained the capacity to support a small rigid-hulled inflatable boat (RHIB) and a limited contingent of Naval Infantry for boarding suspect vessels, as well as maintaining their original 20 mm cannon and 12.7 mm heavy machine guns.

As of 2020, two  coastal mine countermeasures vessels are still in service with the SA Navy, however, they are believed to have lost their mine-hunting capabilities due to the retirement of the antiquated PAP104 autonomous underwater vehicles (AUVs). Whilst still maintaining a decompression chamber for operational diving, the River class are now deployed on general coastal defence duties, and are equipped with a single Oerlikon 20 mm cannon, two 12.7 mm machine guns, and a RHIB.

Alongside the Warrior and River classes are the more modern , with three entering service from 1992. Constructed with twin-hulled catamarans of glass-reinforced plastic sandwich construction, three have also been built for Israel in 1997. The T Craft, with their far lighter construction and smaller size, undertake maritime security patrols considerably closer to the shore and inspect various inlets and bays. SAS Tobie, SAS Tern, and SAS Tekwane are equipped with a single 12.7 mm Browning machine gun and have the capacity to embark a RHIB with a small complement of Naval Infantry to inspect vessels.

Submarine fleet 
Between 2004 and 2008, three German built Type 209/1400 submarines were delivered as a like for like replacement for the obsolescent  submarines. The  represents a significant upgrade of the navy's sub-surface force due to considerable advancement in underwater performance and endurance.As of 2020, South Africa is one of only three states on the African continent, along with Algeria and Egypt, that currently operate submarine assets, and the only state in the sub-Saharan region. With near subsurface supremacy, the SA Navy operates a strong conventional underwater naval deterrent against any theoretical continental state actor. At the same time, this capability was at risk of eroding. As of 2019, two of the submarines were reported to be in need of "urgent and complete" refits. The recommended approach was to move to a contracting phase in 2020. The Armscor annual report to parliament indicated that should the refits not take place, the submarine capability would not available after FY2022/23. As of March 2021, the contracting phase had still not been initiated and no dates had been announced for any upgrades of the submarines.

In August 2021 it was reported that Charlotte Maxeke was being refitted at the Armscor Dockyard. Funding in the amount of R189 million had reportedly been made available to ensure the completion of the refit during the 2023/24 financial year. Funding for the refit of Queen Modjadji was not available, though the reported focus of the Navy was to prioritise essential maintenance and repair of SAS Manthatisi (which had been last refitted during 2013/14) to ensure "expedited operational availability."

Highly sophisticated vessels, the Heroine class' utility, aside from traditional anti-ship engagement and area denial, is its intelligence collection via special forces deployment. A series of modifications have been made to the class so as to undertake these clandestine operations.

Currently fitted only with regular torpedo tubes, the Heroines do have optional UGM-84 Harpoon integration capacity for further anti-ship potential, however, as of 2020, this has not been utilised. Similarly, whilst currently not able to deploy any land attack armaments, Germany is developing a medium-range missile, the IDAS, for their own Type 209s which would primarily be targeted against air threats, but also small surface vessels and coastal land targets.

Auxiliary fleet 
Drakensberg is also modified to carry two RHIBs, as well as two landing craft utility (LCU) for limited amphibious use. Since the end of minority rule, Drakensberg has undertaken numerous humanitarian and anti-piracy operations, consistently shown the ‘rainbow flag’ on global voyages of goodwill, and reintegrated South Africa back into international naval exercises.  

The SA Navy continues to operate the specialist hydrographic survey vessel , which was commissioned in 1972.

Marines 

The South Africa Marine Corps was first established as a sub-branch of the Navy in 1951 until 1955 and then reformed in 1979 until 1990, both times with the primary purpose of protecting the country's harbours. The Marines also acted as regular infantry during the war until 1988, as well as performing counter-insurgency operations inside South Africa. The Marines were disbanded on 18 January 1990, following a major restructuring of the Navy at the end of the South African Border War.

In 2005, the decision was taken to create a Naval Rapid Deployment Force so that South Africa could commit more to peacekeeping operations across the continent, particularly in the Great Lakes region. In 2006, this force became the Maritime Reaction Squadron. The Maritime Reaction Squadron provides an amphibious, diving and small boat capability to the Navy, deploying infantry-trained South African Navy personnel in various peacekeeping roles within the African continent, as well as assisting in boarding operations at sea, and humanitarian and disaster relief.

The squadron consists of the following components:

 Operational Boat Division (OBD) with 10 Namacurra-class harbour patrol boats and six Lima-class utility landing craft
 Reaction Force Division (RFD) consisting of one naval infantry company with a command and support element
 Operational Diving Division (ODD) consisting of four operational diving teams of 17 divers.

Current deployments 
The SA Navy maintains the traditional role of providing a credible military deterrent, protecting South African interests against possible enemy attack, and participating in African Union peacekeeping missions. As the likelihood of a naval engagement against a conventional enemy is extremely unlikely, the South African Navy today is primarily engaged in counter-piracy, fishery protection, and anti-smuggling operations.

Deploying at least a single Valour-class frigate or one Heroine-class submarine, along with aircraft from the South African Air Force, the SA Navy often undertakes exercises with others, such as the United States Navy (Exercise Shared Accord/Southern Accord), NATO naval battlegroups (Exercise Amazolo), the French Navy (the annual Exercise Oxide), the German Navy (the biennial Exercise Good Hope), the Royal Navy (ad hoc exercises when visiting South African waters), the Indian Navy (the biennial Exercise IBSAMAR),  the navies of Uruguay and Brazil (Exercises Atlasur and IBSAMAR), and controversially, exercises with fellow BRICS members Russia and China (Exercise Mosi), which are due to take place following the 2022 Russian invasion of Ukraine.

For the 2010 FIFA World Cup, the navy provided air and sea security by deploying three frigates as guard ships off the cities of Durban, Port Elizabeth and Cape Town.

Operation Copper 
Since 2011, one of the SA Navy's major and long-standing focuses has been that of the anti-piracy initiative, Operation Copper. After increased pirate activity in the Mozambique Channel (a crucial import/export sea lane for South Africa), and subsequent requests for help from fellow Southern African Development Community (SADC) members (Mozambique and Tanzania), the navy has routinely deployed assets in an effort to provide maritime security in the region.

Since the operation first began, every Valour-class frigate has been deployed to the region on rotation, with the refurbished Warrior-class OPVs also being utilised. In 2012, the replenishment ship SAS Drakensberg was likewise deployed to the region, and alongside European warships, successfully captured seven Somail pirates. Elements of the Navy's Maritime Reaction Squadron (MRS) are routinely embarked on deployed warships so as to give the ability to board suspect vessels.

Gaps in deployment have previously occurred as a result of mechanical issues, as well as the South African Air Force withdrawing C-47TP maritime patrol aircraft in 2016 from Mozambique due to maintenance problems and lack of sufficient aircrew. In 2018 the SA Navy notably deployed two warships simultaneously for Operation Copper, and were independent of foreign support.

Piracy, and other maritime crime, has fallen substantially in the Mozambique Channel since the SADC operation began in 2011. Due to the success of the operation, expenditure for the future 2021/22 deployment is estimated to be R38.9 million, down from R154 million the previous year.

Operation Copper's mandate could be subject to official change as a result of increasing Islamist violence in the Cabo Delgado province of Mozambique. On 9 August 2021, the SADC formally announced the deployment of troops into the troubled province. Alongside regional partners such as Botswana, Tanzania and Zimbabwe, the South African government has informed parliament that it intends to deploy 1,495 personnel to Mozambique. SAS Makhanda, a modernised Warrior-class patrol OPV, has reportedly been seen in Pemba, the capital of Cabo Delgado province.

Operation Corona 
For the continued safeguarding of South Africa's borders, Operation Corona aims to combat illegal fishing, poaching, and smuggling within its territorial waters. The SA Navy plans to carry out five maritime patrols in line with Operation Corona, with 84 days of surface and 22 days of subsurface patrols allocated for the financial year 2020/21. Deploying to known hotspot areas, the SA Navy works alongside other Government departments such as the SA Police Service and Department of Environment, Forestry and Fisheries, in an effort to deter rather than arrest.

Relationship with Russian and Chinese Navies

In February 2023, the South African Navy planned to engage in joint exercises with the Chinese and Russian navies that were to be held in waters off South Africa. The exercises, which were highly controversial given Russia's invasion of Ukraine, followed on a January 2023 visit by the Russian foreign minister Sergei Lavrov to Pretoria for meetings with his South African counterpart. Although the exercises were similar to exercises held in previous years, some suggested that they signalled a significant shift in South African policy toward more overt military engagement with China and Russia. The exercise began on February 18 and involved the frigate Admiral Gorshkov and tanker Kama from the Russian Navy along with the destroyer Huainan, the frigate Rizhao and the support ship Kekexilihu from the Chinese Navy. Several vessels from the South African Navy were expected to participate including the frigate Mendi as well as the Warrior-class patrol vessel King Sekhukhune I and the hydrographic survey vessel SAS Protea.

Future of the South African Navy 
As the SA Navy enters the 2020s, the service faces significant challenges if it is to arrest its current decline. At the opening of the South African Maritime Security Conference on 31 May 2018 in Cape Town, Chief of the Navy Vice Admiral Hlogwane warned that:‘the navy sits at the crossroads where its very existence is threatened... Some of the countries in the SADC are injecting financial resources to build their military capacity through acquisition programmes. Conversely, South Africa is on a path of reduced defence expenditure.”At a speech a year later on 12 July 2019, Hlongwane, recognising the struggling economy, again reminded his audience that:“in the absence of a clear and present military threat, the government will find it difficult to justify spending large sums of money on defence. The platforms acquired under the Strategic Defence Packages (four frigates and three submarines) are beginning to suffer from lack of funds for support and maintenance, [and] urgently require refits in order to keep them operational to the end of their 30-year design lives...while the new hydrographic survey vessel and IPVs are modern robust ships fully suited to perform their missions, they will not significantly improve the combat capability of the SAN which is required to defend our country and national interests in terms of our constitutional mandate...the naval balance of power is shifting on our continent.”

Budget 
The South African defence budget has been on a downward trajectory since 1994 when expenditure was 2.56% of GDP. In 2010, that level was 1.12%, and in 2020, expenditure is expected to fall to around 0.95%, its lowest level since 1960. For 2020/21, the Defence Budget totals R52.4 billion (£2.4 billion), with the SA Navy being allocated R4.9 billion (£226 million), roughly 9%. South African defence spending however has not matched recent inflation levels, an average of 5% annually, which has pushed the Department of Defence deeper into financial difficulties and operational consequences.  

As a whole, the Defence Budget for 2020/21 has been given 87% of its required funding, a shortfall of R9.4 billion (£433 million). The SA Navy for 2020/21 has been allocated only 65% of what is reportedly required, a shortfall of R2.8 billion (£130 million). As a result of the declining financial situation, the Navy has warned that it will seriously struggle to maintain its current capabilities, levels of investment, and international commitments. As a result of Covid-19, as well as ongoing problems within the South African economy, GDP is expected to fall by 5.6% in 2020/21, with significant ramifications for the country and the South African Navy.

Operational hours 
In 2013/14, the SA Navy operated with an annual target of 22,000 hours at sea. By 2018/19 this number had been lowered to 12,000 hours, with a further reduction to 10,000 hours annually from 2019/20. By its own admission, the Navy requires a minimum of 12,000 hours (500 days) at sea per year to sufficiently train personnel, with an absolute minimum of 7,800 hours dedicated annually to fulfil its Force Employment obligations of border protection, maritime security, and anti-piracy operations. Despite these requirements, by 2019/20 the SA Navy is financially resourced for only 6,000 hours at sea, and only 4,320 hours allocated for Force Employment operations. Vice Admiral Hlongwane has warned: “Should sea hours be reduced below 10 000 per year, the SA Navy will decline rapidly and...any further reduction in sea hours will impact severely on individual and team training at sea, maintaining safety at sea and the safe navigation of all SA Navy vessels.”

Skills recruitment 
In addition, the SA Navy is facing an acute skills shortage which is severely frustrating vessel availability. Vice Admiral Hlongwane stated that "the Navy Engineering capability is now extremely limited, which will increasingly impact on the safety and seaworthiness of ships and submarines and their ability to deploy." It is currently a cause for concern whether or not the SA Navy has the required skills to fully crew multiple highly sophisticated warships and submarines simultaneously.

Future acquisitions 
Despite the current budgetary crisis within South African defence spending, the purchase of the three new inshore patrol vessels (IPVs), termed Project Biro and also the procurement of a new hydrographic survey vessel, Project Hotel have been approved in recent years. These acquisitions have been linked to the Government's broader aims of development of the ocean economy - Operation Phakisa. With 90% of imports and exports dependent on the sea, South Africa's exclusive economic zone which is reportedly rich in natural resources, and the estimated loss of nearly $23bn annually to illegal and unregulated fishing, the SA Navy has successfully argued that maritime security is crucial to the national interest and economic development.

Project Biro

Since 2013, the ambition for the SA Navy was the domestic construction of three offshore, and a minimum of six (later reduced to three) inshore patrol vessels as a replacement for the increasingly aged Warrior-class OPVs and River-class OPV/IPVs, as part of Project Biro. However, in 2018 it was confirmed that only the three MMIPVs (multi-mission inshore patrol vessel) would be constructed, with the OPVs being cancelled as a cost-saving measure. The new vessels will also be named the Warrior-class, and cost R3.6 billion.

Whilst the introduction of these three modern IPVs will immediately play a crucial role in maritime law enforcement, it has been regretted by analysts that the offshore craft option was not also financially feasible. It had been hoped that the OPVs, with their helicopter carrying abilities, would have played a much more effective role in policing South Africa's extensive exclusive economic zone (1.5 million km), particularly in the rough seas of the Cape. It was even reported in 2011 that nine OPVs could be constructed, without any IPVs, due to the rough sea state off the coast and the practical experience gained which favoured larger vessels.        

In 2021, it was announced that the aging Warrior-class OPVs would undergo phased decommissioning as the new Warrior-class IPVs come online.

First laid down in February 2019 at Damen Shipyards Cape Town (DSCT), the timeline of delivery to the SA Navy of all three vessels is March 2022, June 2023 and September 2024 respectively. Armscor, the state acquisition agency, has an option from DSCT to purchase additional inshore patrol vessels at the same price the original three were bought for.

Project Hotel

The second future acquisition programme for the SA Navy falls under Project Hotel, the replacement of the sole hydrographic survey vessel . The construction of this new vessel, currently being built by Durban based Sandock Austral Shipyard, will represent a major upgrade in capability for the Navy. Whilst SAS Protea was built in 1972, her replacement will be based on Vard Marine's VARD 9 105 science vessel, specifically adapted for South African service and ‘incorporates the latest hydrographic and oceanographic sensor suite’.

Also as part of Project Hotel, the SA Navy will receive two next-generation survey motor boats, one sea boat, and another inshore survey motor boat to be kept ashore in reserve, as well as upgrading shore-based hydrographic infrastructure. The project has a current completion date target of August 2023, with the first of the motor boats being launched in September 2020.

Issues 
As of 2020, the SA Navy's main projects are under serious threat from years of underfunding, as well as recent budget cuts. Allocation of funding for Projects Biro (modern inshore patrol vessels) and Hotel (replacement hydrographic survey vessel), as well as the Army's Project Hoefyster (new infantry combat vehicles), amounts to R2.8 billion (£129 million), however the required level of funding needed is expected to be R13.7 billion (£633 million), nearly a R11 billion shortfall (£508 million). It is currently unclear how these projects will be financed if they continue to proceed.

According to a 2021 Department of Defence (DoD) progress report, the full repair cost requirement of R1.470 billion is only 53.4% funded, with R786 million allocated. The SA Navy is currently finding it difficult to effectively resource the growing backlog of refits, maintenance periods, and repair projects that are needed. With each delay due to financial insufficiency and every vessel that continues to operate without adequate maintenance, the SA Navy is pulled deeper into a vicious cycle of exacerbating known issues and escalating longer-term costs, until a point of forced reduced vessel availability.

Command, control & organisation

The command structure is depicted below. The Chief of the Navy, based at Navy Headquarters at the Navy Office (SAS Immortelle) located in Pretoria, is head of the South African Navy. All operational forces, including ships and submarines, fall under the control of the Flag Officer Fleet who is based in Simon's Town.

Fleet Command

Fleet Command includes all vessels and units of the Navy other than Naval Headquarters, Pretoria. Fleet Command is based in Simon's Town under control of Flag Officer Fleet.

Four directorates are responsible for the day to day control of Fleet Command:

 Director Fleet Force Preparations (DFPP) is responsible for the day-to-day running of the ships and submarines and for ensuring their operational readiness. The Maritime Reaction Squadron and NavComCens also report to DFFP
 Director Fleet Human Resources (DFHR) is responsible for all training and manning and also controls the training units.
 Director Fleet Quality Assurance (DFQA) is responsible for the output of Fleet Command and monitoring quality assurance throughout Fleet Command
 Director Fleet Logistics (DFL) is responsible for all Logistics units as well as for the maintenance of the fleet.

Naval bases

The Navy operates the following Naval Bases:
Naval Base Simon's Town – the largest and main naval base currently used by the South African Navy.  Constructed by the Dutch East India Company in 1743, and later developed by the Royal Navy, the base was transferred to South Africa in 1957 as part of the Simon’s Town Agreement and expanded in 1975. Simon’s Town is the homeport of the frigate and submarine flotillas, as well as housing training facilities.
Naval Base Durban – constructed during the Second World War to better serve the deployment of naval vessels off the eastern coast of Africa, particularly after the Japanese declaration of war in 1941. In 2002 Durban was downgraded to a Naval Station with much of the infrastructure being taken over by the Army and later abandoned. In 2012, the decision was taken to renovate and expand the facilities. However, it was announced in 2020 that due to budget constraints, the reclassification of Durban as a fully operational Naval Base would be delayed. The station is currently home to the fleet's offshore patrol flotilla and will continue to be so after the delivery of replacement offshore/inshore vessels.
 Naval Station Port Elizabeth – provides support to the fleet and host to visiting ships, however no major vessels are based here.

Training units
 – located on the West Coast and provides training and development for ratings.
 –  located in the Greater Cape Town area. Historically provided practical training for apprentices, but now offers training to both ratings and officers.
 SAS Simonsberg – located in Simon’s Town and provides training in gunnery, anti-submarine warfare, communications, diving and seamanship. Simonsberg also includes:
 Maritime Warfare Training Centre.
 Submarine Training Centre, East Yard.
 Nuclear, Biological, Chemical, Damage Control Training Centre.
 Military Training Centre, West Yard.
South African Naval College - located in Gordon's Bay, the establishment provides training for naval officers.

Personnel

As of the end of the financial year 2018/19, there were approximately 6,816 active uniformed members of the SA Navy, just short of the 7,071 target. In addition, there are a further 1,071 civilian staff that further support the Navy.

In 2006, the old Naval Reserve Units that were modelled on the Royal Naval Reserve system were closed down. A new Navy Reserve system was created consisting of roughly 1,000 reserve posts. These posts are pooled and members are drawn from them as needed to augment full-time units and ships' companies.

Uniforms
From 1922 to the 1940s the SA Navy was effectively an extension of the Royal Navy, and therefore wore the same uniforms and similar insignia. As British influence was gradually curtailed, in 1959 the British Crown in the SA Navy cap badge was replaced with the Lion of Nassau from the crest of the country's coat of arms. A black beret later replaced the peaked cap in working uniforms.

In 2000 the new Coat of Arms was unveiled and the Chief of the Navy tasked Fleet Command to look at revising the Navy uniforms to reflect the new coat of arms. This saw new rank insignia for non-commissioned officers being implemented as well as the introduction of a side cap.

Ranks

Due to historical influence, the rank system is based on that of the Royal Navy.

Naval ensign

Naval jack

Ships and weapons

Ships

Combat fleet

Support fleet

Air force maritime aircraft
Although the SA Navy does not operate any aircraft itself, aircraft used on ships or supporting are operated by 22 Squadron SAAF:

 1 × Atlas Oryx – medium utility helicopter (deployed on SAS Drakensberg)
 4 × Westland Super Lynx 300 Mk64 – ASW and ASuW helicopter (deployed on the Valour-class frigates)
There is a planned programme to equip the frigates with UAVs to supplement the helicopters. Previously before its retirement, the SAAF operated the Westland Wasp for the SA Navy in the anti-submarine warfare role.

Naval weapons systems

Gallery

See also

 List of South African military chiefs
 Military history of South Africa
 South African environmental patrol vessels
 South African Naval Museum

Notes

References

External links

 South African Navy home page
 Ships of the South African Navy, Past & Present 
 South African Navy uniform regulations

 
Maritime history of South Africa
Military of South Africa